Blaberus is a genus of cockroaches generally found in South America. About 19 species are in the genus, and they are popular among hobbyists as feed for other arthropods (Blaberus discoidalis in particular serves this function) or as pets. Unlike several genera of cockroaches considered to be pests, this genus keeps its ootheca in its abdomen until the time it hatches. They generally require a relative humidity of 60% or higher to thrive and temperatures above 25 °C (28-30 °C is best) to reproduce.

Blaberus giganteus is one of the world's longest roaches. B. craniifer'''s popular name, "death's head roach" is often attributed to B. discoidalis, as well.

This genus contains these species:

 Blaberus affinis Jurberg, Albuquerque, Rebordoes, Goncalves & Felippe, 1977
 Blaberus anisitsi Brancsik, 1898
 Blaberus asellus (Thunberg, 1826)
 Blaberus atropos (Stoll, 1813) (= "Blaberus fusca") 
 Blaberus boliviensis Princis, 1946
 Blaberus brasilianus Saussure, 1864
 Blaberus colosseus (Illiger, 1801)
 Blaberus craniifer Burmeister, 1838
 Blaberus discoidalis Serville, 1839
 Blaberus duckei Jurberg, Albuquerque, Rebordoes, Goncalves & Felippe, 1977
 Blaberus fusiformis Walker, 1868
 Blaberus giganteus (Linnaeus, 1758)
 Blaberus latissimus (Herbst, 1786)
 Blaberus matogrossensis Rocha e Silva & Aguiar, 1977
 Blaberus minor Saussure, 1864
 Blaberus parabolicus Walker, 1868
 Blaberus paulistanus Lopes & de Oliveira, 2000
 Blaberus peruvianus Jurberg, Albuquerque, Rebordoes, Goncalves & Felippe, 1977
 Blaberus scutatus'' Saussure & Zehntner, 1894

References 

Cockroach genera